David Robert Batton (born March 26, 1956) is a retired American professional basketball player. At a height of 2.08 m (6'10") tall, he played at the center position.

College career
Batton played college basketball at the University of Notre Dame, with the Fighting Irish.

Professional career
After college, he was selected by the New Jersey Nets, in the 3rd round (62nd pick overall), of the 1978 NBA draft. He played for the Washington Bullets (1982–83), and San Antonio Spurs (1983–84), in the National Basketball Association, in 58 games.

NBA career statistics

Regular season 

|-
| style="text-align:left;"| 
| style="text-align:left;"|Washington
| 54 || 5 || 10.3 || .445 || .000 || .471 || 2.2 || 0.5 || 0.3 || 0.2 || 3.3
|-
| style="text-align:left;"| 
| style="text-align:left;"|San Antonio
| 4 || 0 || 7.8 || .500 || – || – || 1.0 || 0.8 || 0.0 || 0.8 || 2.5
|- class="sortbottom"
| style="text-align:center;" colspan="2"| Career
| 58 || 5 || 10.2 || .448 || .000 || .471 || 2.1 || 0.6 || 0.3 || 0.6 || 3.2

External links

Italian League Profile 

1956 births
Living people
American expatriate basketball people in Italy
American men's basketball players
Basketball players from Baltimore
Centers (basketball)
Mens Sana Basket players
New Jersey Nets draft picks
Notre Dame Fighting Irish men's basketball players
Pallacanestro Cantù players
Parade High School All-Americans (boys' basketball)
San Antonio Spurs players
Washington Bullets players